The Sumatran slow loris (Nycticebus hilleri) is a strepsirrhine primate and a species of slow loris that is native to Sumatra. 

While this species used to be considered a junior synonym of the Sunda slow loris, it is now recognized by the IUCN as a full species. This species is named after Hiram M. Hiller Jr., who collected the holotype of this species while exploring the East Indies in 1901.

References 

Mammals of Indonesia
Slow lorises
Mammals described in 1902